The Braille pattern dots-125 is a 6-dot braille cell with the top left and both middle dots raised, or an 8-dot braille cell with the top left and both upper-middle dots raised. It is represented by the Unicode code point U+2813, and in Braille ASCII with H.

Unified Braille

In unified international braille, the braille pattern dots-125 is used to represent guttural fricatives and approximants, such as /h/, /ħ/, or /ɦ/, and is otherwise assigned as needed. It is also used for the number 8.

Table of unified braille values

Other braille

Plus dots 7 and 8

Related to Braille pattern dots-125 are Braille patterns 1257, 1258, and 12578, which are used in 8-dot braille systems, such as Gardner-Salinas and Luxembourgish Braille.

Related 8-dot kantenji patterns

In the Japanese kantenji braille, the standard 8-dot Braille patterns 236, 1236, 2346, and 12346 are the patterns related to Braille pattern dots-125, since the two additional dots of kantenji patterns 0125, 1257, and 01257 are placed above the base 6-dot cell, instead of below, as in standard 8-dot braille.

Kantenji using braille patterns 236, 1236, 2346, or 12346

This listing includes kantenji using Braille pattern dots-125 for all 6349 kanji found in JIS C 6226-1978.

  - 分

Variants and thematic compounds

  -  り/分 + selector 1  =  今
  -  selector 5 + り/分  =  帚
  -  selector 6 + り/分  =  僉
  -  数 + #8  =  八
  -  比 + り/分  =  里

Compounds of 分

  -  い/糹/#2 + り/分  =  紛
  -  を/貝 + り/分  =  貪
  -  ち/竹 + り/分  =  雰
  -  お/頁 + り/分  =  頒
  -  り/分 + の/禾  =  粉
  -  と/戸 + り/分 + の/禾  =  彜
  -  り/分 + を/貝  =  貧
  -  や/疒 + り/分 + selector 1  =  岑
  -  ね/示 + り/分 + selector 1  =  衾
  -  よ/广 + り/分 + selector 1  =  矜
  -  れ/口 + 宿 + り/分  =  吩
  -  や/疒 + う/宀/#3 + り/分  =  岔
  -  り/分 + 宿 + 心  =  忿
  -  て/扌 + 宿 + り/分  =  扮
  -  心 + 龸 + り/分  =  枌
  -  り/分 + も/門 + selector 1  =  氛
  -  に/氵 + 宿 + り/分  =  汾
  -  ま/石 + 宿 + り/分  =  竕
  -  く/艹 + 宿 + り/分  =  芬

Compounds of 今

  -  れ/口 + り/分  =  吟
  -  り/分 + れ/口  =  含
  -  く/艹 + り/分 + れ/口  =  莟
  -  り/分 + 心  =  念
  -  き/木 + り/分 + 心  =  棯
  -  の/禾 + り/分 + 心  =  稔
  -  せ/食 + り/分 + 心  =  鯰
  -  し/巿 + り/分 + selector 1  =  黔

Compounds of 帚

  -  ふ/女 + り/分  =  婦
  -  ん/止 + り/分  =  帰
  -  て/扌 + り/分  =  掃
  -  く/艹 + selector 5 + り/分  =  菷
  -  ち/竹 + 宿 + り/分  =  箒
  -  ん/止 + ん/止 + り/分  =  歸

Compounds of 僉

  -  や/疒 + り/分  =  嶮
  -  り/分 + 氷/氵  =  斂
  -  に/氵 + り/分 + 氷/氵  =  瀲
  -  ん/止 + selector 6 + り/分  =  歛
  -  ち/竹 + selector 6 + り/分  =  簽
  -  仁/亻 + 仁/亻 + り/分  =  儉
  -  も/門 + 宿 + り/分  =  匳
  -  き/木 + き/木 + り/分  =  檢
  -  ⺼ + 宿 + り/分  =  臉
  -  さ/阝 + さ/阝 + り/分  =  險
  -  そ/馬 + そ/馬 + り/分  =  驗
  -  り/分 + れ/口 + れ/口  =  龠
  -  か/金 + 宿 + り/分  =  鑰

Compounds of 八

  -  う/宀/#3 + り/分  =  穴
  -  い/糹/#2 + う/宀/#3 + り/分  =  穽
  -  こ/子 + う/宀/#3 + り/分  =  窖
  -  か/金 + う/宀/#3 + り/分  =  窩
  -  火 + う/宀/#3 + り/分  =  竃
  -  氷/氵 + う/宀/#3 + り/分  =  竅
  -  つ/土 + う/宀/#3 + り/分  =  竇
  -  ひ/辶 + う/宀/#3 + り/分  =  邃
  -  囗 + り/分  =  興
  -  火 + 囗 + り/分  =  爨
  -  せ/食 + 囗 + り/分  =  釁
  -  れ/口 + 数 + り/分  =  叭
  -  か/金 + 数 + り/分  =  釟

Compounds of 里

  -  よ/广 + り/分  =  厘
  -  か/金 + よ/广 + り/分  =  甅
  -  ま/石 + よ/广 + り/分  =  竰
  -  き/木 + よ/广 + り/分  =  釐
  -  へ/⺩ + り/分  =  理
  -  ま/石 + り/分  =  童
  -  る/忄 + り/分  =  憧
  -  か/金 + り/分  =  鐘
  -  な/亻 + ま/石 + り/分  =  僮
  -  し/巿 + ま/石 + り/分  =  幢
  -  て/扌 + ま/石 + り/分  =  撞
  -  き/木 + ま/石 + り/分  =  橦
  -  に/氵 + ま/石 + り/分  =  潼
  -  ふ/女 + ま/石 + り/分  =  艟
  -  龸 + り/分  =  重
  -  な/亻 + り/分  =  働
  -  の/禾 + り/分  =  種
  -  ゆ/彳 + り/分  =  衝
  -  り/分 + ぬ/力  =  動
  -  る/忄 + り/分 + ぬ/力  =  慟
  -  ⺼ + 龸 + り/分  =  腫
  -  く/艹 + 龸 + り/分  =  董
  -  み/耳 + 龸 + り/分  =  踵
  -  か/金 + 龸 + り/分  =  鍾
  -  つ/土 + り/分  =  埋
  -  日 + り/分  =  量
  -  せ/食 + り/分  =  鯉
  -  り/分 + ね/示  =  裏
  -  り/分 + よ/广  =  野
  -  つ/土 + り/分 + よ/广  =  墅
  -  な/亻 + 比 + り/分  =  俚
  -  れ/口 + 比 + り/分  =  哩
  -  に/氵 + 比 + り/分  =  浬
  -  け/犬 + 比 + り/分  =  狸
  -  ね/示 + 比 + り/分  =  裡
  -  そ/馬 + 比 + り/分  =  貍
  -  ち/竹 + 比 + り/分  =  霾

Other compounds

  -  仁/亻 + り/分  =  倹
  -  き/木 + り/分  =  検
  -  さ/阝 + り/分  =  険
  -  そ/馬 + り/分  =  験
  -  ん/止 + 宿 + り/分  =  鹸
  -  く/艹 + り/分  =  兵
  -  に/氵 + り/分  =  浜
  -  き/木 + く/艹 + り/分  =  梹
  -  か/金 + く/艹 + り/分  =  鋲
  -  り/分 + え/訁  =  会
  -  心 + り/分  =  桧
  -  り/分 + も/門  =  余
  -  り/分 + と/戸  =  斜
  -  り/分 + ゑ/訁  =  叙
  -  selector 1 + り/分 + ゑ/訁  =  敍
  -  り/分 + り/分 + ゑ/訁  =  敘
  -  た/⽥ + り/分 + も/門  =  畭
  -  心 + り/分 + も/門  =  荼
  -  む/車 + り/分 + も/門  =  蜍
  -  り/分 + り/分 + も/門  =  餘
  -  り/分 + り/分 + も/門  =  餘
  -  り/分 + か/金  =  平
  -  り/分 + つ/土  =  坪
  -  え/訁 + り/分  =  評
  -  や/疒 + り/分 + か/金  =  岼
  -  る/忄 + り/分 + か/金  =  怦
  -  に/氵 + り/分 + か/金  =  泙
  -  く/艹 + り/分 + か/金  =  萍
  -  の/禾 + り/分 + か/金  =  秤
  -  心 + り/分 + か/金  =  苹
  -  せ/食 + り/分 + か/金  =  鮃
  -  り/分 + へ/⺩  =  全
  -  ゑ/訁 + り/分  =  詮
  -  き/木 + り/分 + へ/⺩  =  栓
  -  や/疒 + り/分 + へ/⺩  =  痊
  -  ち/竹 + り/分 + へ/⺩  =  筌
  -  か/金 + り/分 + へ/⺩  =  銓
  -  火 + 宿 + り/分  =  竈
  -  り/分 + ⺼  =  益
  -  氷/氵 + り/分  =  溢
  -  え/訁 + り/分 + ⺼  =  謚
  -  か/金 + り/分 + ⺼  =  鎰
  -  り/分 + 宿 + せ/食  =  鷁
  -  り/分 + せ/食  =  舎
  -  り/分 + ほ/方  =  舗
  -  り/分 + り/分 + せ/食  =  舍
  -  り/分 + り/分 + ほ/方  =  舖
  -  り/分 + selector 4 + よ/广  =  舒
  -  た/⽥ + り/分  =  典
  -  き/木 + た/⽥ + り/分  =  椣
  -  ⺼ + た/⽥ + り/分  =  腆
  -  し/巿 + り/分  =  幌
  -  け/犬 + り/分  =  猪
  -  に/氵 + け/犬 + り/分  =  潴
  -  け/犬 + う/宀/#3 + り/分  =  豬
  -  め/目 + り/分  =  窺
  -  す/発 + り/分  =  罹
  -  り/分 + お/頁  =  倉
  -  や/疒 + り/分 + お/頁  =  瘡
  -  ふ/女 + り/分 + お/頁  =  艙
  -  く/艹 + り/分 + お/頁  =  蒼
  -  み/耳 + り/分 + お/頁  =  蹌
  -  か/金 + り/分 + お/頁  =  鎗
  -  る/忄 + り/分 + お/頁  =  愴
  -  て/扌 + り/分 + お/頁  =  搶
  -  き/木 + り/分 + お/頁  =  槍
  -  に/氵 + り/分 + お/頁  =  滄
  -  り/分 + な/亻  =  傘
  -  り/分 + け/犬  =  兼
  -  る/忄 + り/分 + け/犬  =  慊
  -  ん/止 + り/分 + け/犬  =  歉
  -  心 + り/分 + け/犬  =  蒹
  -  を/貝 + り/分 + け/犬  =  賺
  -  り/分 + 囗  =  合
  -  れ/口 + り/分 + 囗  =  哈
  -  ふ/女 + り/分 + 囗  =  姶
  -  や/疒 + り/分 + 囗  =  峇
  -  る/忄 + り/分 + 囗  =  恰
  -  て/扌 + り/分 + 囗  =  拿
  -  ん/止 + り/分 + 囗  =  歙
  -  に/氵 + り/分 + 囗  =  洽
  -  ⺼ + り/分 + 囗  =  盒
  -  ち/竹 + り/分 + 囗  =  箚
  -  の/禾 + り/分 + 囗  =  粭
  -  心 + り/分 + 囗  =  荅
  -  む/車 + り/分 + 囗  =  蛤
  -  ね/示 + り/分 + 囗  =  袷
  -  も/門 + り/分 + 囗  =  閤
  -  と/戸 + り/分 + 囗  =  鞳
  -  ま/石 + り/分 + 囗  =  龕
  -  り/分 + む/車 + selector 2  =  翕
  -  り/分 + 龸 + せ/食  =  鴿
  -  り/分 + さ/阝  =  命
  -  て/扌 + り/分 + さ/阝  =  掵
  -  り/分 + 日  =  昌
  -  な/亻 + り/分 + 日  =  倡
  -  ふ/女 + り/分 + 日  =  娼
  -  き/木 + り/分 + 日  =  椙
  -  け/犬 + り/分 + 日  =  猖
  -  心 + り/分 + 日  =  菖
  -  り/分 + め/目  =  穿
  -  り/分 + り/分 + え/訁  =  會
  -  け/犬 + り/分 + え/訁  =  獪
  -  ⺼ + り/分 + え/訁  =  膾
  -  く/艹 + り/分 + え/訁  =  薈
  -  せ/食 + り/分 + え/訁  =  鱠
  -  心 + 心 + り/分  =  檜
  -  り/分 + 仁/亻 + 宿  =  个
  -  り/分 + 宿 + 宿  =  兜
  -  り/分 + 宿 + も/門  =  兮
  -  そ/馬 + 数 + り/分  =  尓
  -  に/氵 + に/氵 + り/分  =  濱
  -  り/分 + 宿 + き/木  =  禽
  -  心 + 宿 + り/分  =  檎

Notes

Braille patterns